{{DISPLAYTITLE:UPt3}}

UPt3 is an inorganic binary intermetallic crystalline compound of platinum and uranium.

Production 
It can be syntetized in the following ways:
 as an intermetallic compound, by direct fusion of pure components according to stoichiometric calculations:

 

 by reduction of uranium dioxide with hydrogen in the presence of platinum:

Physical properties 
UPt3 forms crystals of hexagonal symmetry (some studies hypothesize a trigonal structure instead), space group P63/mmc, cell parameters a = 0.5766 nm and c = 0.4898 nm (c should be understood as distance from planes), with a structure similar to nisnite (Ni3Sn) and MgCd3.

The compound congruently melts at 1700 °C. The enthalpy of formation of the compound is -111 kJ/mol.

At temperatures below 1 K it becomes superconducting, thought to be due to the presence of heavy fermions (the uranium atoms).

References

Platinum compounds
Uranium compounds